The Canterbury Crusaders were a motorcycle speedway team who operated from the Kingsmead Stadium, Kingsmead Road, Canterbury from 1968 to 1987. For all of their 20-year existence, the Crusaders operated at the second level of British league speedway, in British League Division Two and the National League.

History 
Canterbury were founder members of British League Division Two in 1968. The first meeting at Kingsmead, on 18 May 1968, saw the Crusaders narrowly lose a British League Division Two fixture 38–39 to Belle Vue Colts. The Colts and the Crusaders had contested the first ever Division Two fixture ten days previously at Belle Vue on 8 May, when the Colts won 55–23.

The Crusaders' first league title was won in 1970, and a second championship was to follow in 1978. In 1977 the promoters Johnnie Hoskins and Wally Mawdsley had to go to court in order to keep the Kingsmead track open after complaints of noise from local residents. However, the team were forced to disband in 1987 when the Canterbury Council refused to renew the lease.

The final Crusaders fixture took place at Kingsmead on 31 October 1987, when Canterbury defeated Rye House Rockets 49–29 in the second leg of the Kent/Herts Trophy. Greyhound racing continued at Kingsmead until 1999 but the site is now a housing estate.

Notable riders
The longest serving rider was Barney Kennett who rode for the Crusaders from 1971 until 1984. Barney is the brother of riders Gordon Kennett and Dave Kennett and is uncle to Edward Kennett.

Nigel Boocock
Barry Thomas
Barney Kennett
 Graham Miles
 Graham Banks
 Ted Hubbard
 Martyn Piddock
 Steve Koppe
 Mike Ferreira

Teams
1977
Steve Koppe
Bob Spelta
Barney Kennett
Graham Banks
Graham Clifton
Brendan Shilleto
Bob Canning

Season summary

See also
List of defunct motorcycle speedway teams in the United Kingdom

References

Defunct British speedway teams
Sport in Canterbury